Antoinette Uys (born 2 March 1976) is a badminton player from South Africa. She was the mixed doubles gold medalists at the 2002 African Championships and 2003 All-Africa Games. Uys competed in badminton at the 2004 Summer Olympics in the mixed doubles with partner Chris Dednam. They lost to Tsai Chia-Hsin and Cheng Wen-Hsing of Chinese Taipei in the round of 32.

Achievements

All-Africa Games 
Women's doubles

Mixed doubles

African Championships 
Mixed doubles

IBF International 
Women's doubles

Mixed doubles

References 
 
 tournamentsoftware.com

External links 
 
 
 
 

1976 births
Living people
Sportspeople from Durban
South African female badminton players
Badminton players at the 2004 Summer Olympics
Olympic badminton players of South Africa
Competitors at the 2003 All-Africa Games
African Games gold medalists for South Africa
African Games bronze medalists for South Africa
African Games medalists in badminton
20th-century South African women
21st-century South African women